Of Women and Frogs is a 2018 novel by Nigerian-Ghanaian writer Bisi Adjapon. Of Women and Frogs was first published by Farafina Books in Nigeria, and in February 2020, HarperCollins acquired the world English-language publishing rights in the book, re-titled The Teller of Secrets for the US market.

Plot
Of Women and Frogs is a novel about Esi, a Nigerian-Ghanaian teenager, which tells about some of the challenges girls in Ghana and Africa at large. As described by The Lagos Review, "The themes Adjapon examines in this amazing work include deceit, heartbreak, domestic violence, deaths, failure of leadership, military dictatorship and abuse of power."

Awards and recognition
The Top 10 Nigerian Books of 2019 by Channels Television
"Five must-read books by Ghanaian writers" on Mail & Guardian, July 3, 2020
Short story version was longlisted for The Caine Prize for African Writing in 2019

References

2018 Nigerian novels
Feminist novels
Young adult novels